Antonin Guigonnat  (born 2 July 1991) is a French biathlete who competes internationally.

He participated in the 2018 Winter Olympics, and is the brother of Gilonne Guigonnat.

Biathlon results
All results are sourced from the International Biathlon Union.

Olympic Games

World Championships
3 medals (2 gold, 1 silver)

*The single mixed relay was added as an event in 2019.

World Cup
World Cup rankings

Relay victories
4 victories

References

External links

1991 births
Living people
French male biathletes
Olympic biathletes of France
Biathletes at the 2018 Winter Olympics
Sportspeople from Haute-Savoie
Biathlon World Championships medalists
20th-century French people
21st-century French people